The rufous horseshoe bat (Rhinolophus rouxii) is a species of bat in the family Rhinolophidae. It is found in China, India, Myanmar, Nepal, Sri Lanka, and Vietnam.

It has been identified as a vector of severe acute respiratory syndrome coronavirus (SARS-CoV or SARS-CoV-1) that caused the 2002–2004 SARS outbreak.

References

Rhinolophidae
Mammals of Sri Lanka
Mammals of India
Mammals of Nepal
Mammals described in 1835
Taxonomy articles created by Polbot
Taxa named by Coenraad Jacob Temminck
Bats of South Asia

Bats of India